In Mandaeism, the nishimta or nishma is the human soul. It is can also be considered as equivalent to the "psyche" or "ego". It is distinct from ruha ('spirit'), as well as from mana ('nous'). In Mandaeism, humans are considered to be made up of the physical body (pagra), soul (nišimta), and spirit (ruha).

In the afterlife
When a Mandaean person dies, priests perform elaborate death rituals or death masses called masiqta in order to help guide the soul (nišimta) towards the World of Light. In order to pass from Tibil (Earth) to the World of Light, the soul must go through multiple maṭarta (watch-stations, toll-stations, or purgatories; see also Arcs of Descent and Ascent and araf (Islam)) before finally being reunited with the dmuta, the soul's heavenly counterpart.

A successful masiqta merges the incarnate soul (roughly equivalent to the psyche or "ego" in Greek philosophy) and spirit (roughly equivalent to the pneuma or "breath" in Greek philosophy) from the Earth (Tibil) into a new merged entity in the World of Light called the ʿuṣṭuna ('trunk', a word of Indo-Iranian origin). The ʿuṣṭuna can then reunite with its heavenly, non-incarnate counterpart (or spiritual image), the dmuta, in the World of Light, where it will reside in the world of ideal counterparts (Mšunia Kušṭa).

See also
Ruha (spirit)
Mana (Mandaeism) (nous)
Nafs in Islam
Jiva in Hinduism
Ancient Egyptian conception of the soul

References

Mandaic words and phrases
Mandaean philosophical concepts
Conceptions of self
Vitalism